McCarthy Valley is an ice-filled valley,  long, between Peters Butte and Todd Ridge in the northwest part of the Long Hills, Horlick Mountains, Antarctica. It was mapped by the United States Geological Survey from surveys and U.S. Navy aerial photography, 1958–60, and was named by the Advisory Committee on Antarctic Names for James E. McCarthy, a meteorological electronics technician at Byrd Station in 1960.

References

Valleys of Antarctica
Landforms of Wilkes Land